WarnerTV Comedy (until 24 September 2021: TNT Comedy) is a German pay television channel, originally launched on 8 May 2012 as glitz*. It is owned by Warner Bros. Discovery International.

In August 2013, SES Platform Services (later MX1, now part of SES Video) won an international tender by Turner Broadcasting System, to provide playout services for Glitz, Boomerang, Cartoon Network, TNT Film and TNT Serie for the German-speaking market, digitisation of existing Turner content, and playout for Turner on-demand and catch-up services in Germany, Austria, Switzerland the Benelux region, from November 2013.

On 1 April 2014 the channel was renamed TNT Glitz and started broadcasting via satellite on Sky Germany. The slogan Here shines the sun ("Hier scheint die Sonne") was changed to We are pink ("Wir sind pink").

The channel was rebranded WarnerTV Comedy on September 25, 2021.

Programming
WarnerTV Comedy features the German first-runs of the comedy series Parks and Recreation, Web Therapy, Girls and Hot in Cleveland as well as the drama series Pretty Little Liars, Parenthood and Unforgettable. Original programming includes the magazine InStyle – Das TV-Magazin, which is centered on fashion and celebrities. It is presented by Eva Padberg.

Original programming
 InStyle – Das TV-Magazin

Series

 2 Broke Girls (2013-2014, 2016–present)
 Bobcat Goldthwait's Misfits & Monsters (Misfits & Monsters) (2018–present)
 Gilmore Girls (2013-2016)
 Girls (2012-2018)
 Grey's Anatomy (2012-2016)
 Hart to Hart (Hart aber herzlich) (2012-2014)
 Hot in Cleveland (2012–present)
 I'm Sorry (2017–present)
 Man Seeking Woman (2016-2018)
 McLeod's Daughters (McLeods Töchter) (2012-2016)
 Parenthood (2012-2016)
 Parks and Recreation (2012-2014, 2016)
 Pretty Little Liars (2012-2016)
 Private Practice (2013-2015)
 Seinfeld (2016–present)
 The Big Bang Theory (2017–present)
 Those Who Can't (2016–present)
 Two and a Half Men (2016–present)
 Unforgettable (2012-2016)
 Web Therapy (2012-2018)
 Younger (2016–present)

Animated series

 American Dad! (2017–present)
 Assy McGee
 China, IL
 Dr. Stone (planned)
 Final Space
 Futurama
 Harley Quinn
 Harvey Birdman, Attorney at Law
 Lucy, the Daughter of the Devil
 Moral Orel
 Ren and Stimpy
 Rick and Morty
 The Rising of the Shield Hero (planned)
 Sealab 2021
 Smiling Friends
 That Time I Got Reincarnated as a Slime (planned)
 The Venture Bros. (2016–present)

Reality

 The Rachel Zoe Project
 Top Chef
 The Outdoor Room with Jamie Ddurie

Logos

References

Further reading
  "glitz*" - Launch in München: So feierten die Promi-Ladys den neuen TV-Sender - Leute - Bild.de
  Frauensender Glitz im Pay-TV - Irgendwie ein Lebensgefühl - Medien - sueddeutsche.de

External links
 Official website

Comedy
Television stations in Germany
German-language television stations
Turner Broadcasting System Germany
Television channels and stations established in 2012